Rheta Grimsley Johnson (born 1953) is a reporter and columnist for King Features Syndicate of New York. Johnson travels the country in search of stories, frequently reporting from her native South, with datelines from Washington, D.C., to Iuka, Mississippi.

Education, career and awards
Johnson is a 1977 graduate of Auburn University and winner of the 1974-75 National Pacemaker Award while on the staff of The Auburn Plainsman.

From 1980 until 1994, when she joined the Atlanta Journal-Constitution, she was a reporter and columnist for The Commercial Appeal in Memphis, Tennessee, and Scripps Howard News Service. She worked for the AJC for seven years. She has earned numerous awards for her writing, including the National Headliner Award for commentary in 1985 and Scripps Howard's Ernie Pyle Memorial Award for outstanding human interest reporting in 1984. In 2010 she received the Clarence Cason Award in Nonfiction Writing from the University of Alabama's journalism department.

She was Scripps Howard Writer of the Year from 1983 to 1985. And in 1991, she was one of three finalists for the Pulitzer Prize for Commentary.

In 1989 she wrote Good Grief, the authorized biography of Charles Schulz. In 2008 she published the book Poor Man's Provence: Finding Myself in Cajun Louisiana.

Personal life

She was formerly married to Jimmy Johnson, creator of the Arlo and Janis comic strip that appears in many U.S. newspapers. The two remain close friends.

Books by Rheta Grimsley Johnson

Further reading
  Hunter James and Rheta Grimsley Johnson, They Didn't Put That on the Huntley-Brinkley!: A Vagabond Reporter Encounters the New South, University of Georgia Press, February, 1993, hardcover,

References

American columnists
20th-century American biographers
Auburn University alumni
Living people
1953 births
American women columnists
Ernie Pyle Award winners
American women biographers
20th-century American journalists
20th-century American women writers
21st-century American non-fiction writers
21st-century American journalists
21st-century American women writers